The Killing Game is a 2011 Lifetime Original Movie based on the novel The Killing Game by Iris Johansen. It was directed by Bobby Roth. The film premiered on Lifetime on October 30, 2011.

Plot
Forensic sculptor Eve Duncan (Laura Prepon) who, 10 years after the disappearance and murder of her seven-year-old daughter Bonnie, is contacted by a man claiming to be her killer. Taunted by the man's mysterious clues about Bonnie's case, Eve becomes involved in his sadistic game when he threatens to kill another little girl that he targeted because she resembles her precious daughter. Memories haunt her as she is caught in a web of deceit and gambles with her own life tracking down the deadly serial killer in the hopes of saving the girl's life's and discovering Bonnie's final resting place.

Cast
 Laura Prepon as Eve Duncan
 Ty Olsson as Joe Quinn
 Kavan Smith as Mark
 Teryl Rothery as Sarah Patrick
 Brian Markinson as Spiro
 Naomi Judd as Sandra Duncan
 Jamie Bloch as Jane
 Laura Wilson as Debby Jordan
 Ian Butcher as Robert Fraser
 Kathryn Dobbs as Nancy Taylor

Reception
Released around Halloween, 2011, the TV reviewer David Hinckley of the New York Daily News said, the movie "provides a holiday-appropriate way to wrap up Halloween while you're unwrapping the candy corn." He says the movie may have trouble competing against other police procedurals then common on television at the time: "While Prepon does a good job conveying Eve's controlled desperation, with a mix of shrewd insight and world-weary self-protection, she's also got a lot of competition these days from women playing smart investigators. Kyra Sedgwick, Dana Delany, Maria Bello. It's a tough crowd to stand out in."

References

External links

2011 television films
2011 films
2011 crime films
American serial killer films
Films based on American novels
Lifetime (TV network) films
Films directed by Bobby Roth
2010s serial killer films
2010s American films